Markaryd is a locality and the seat of Markaryd Municipality, Kronoberg County, Sweden with 3,966 inhabitants in 2010.

International relations

Twin towns — Sister cities
Markaryd is twinned with:
  Bytów, Poland

References 

Populated places in Kronoberg County
Populated places in Markaryd Municipality
Municipal seats of Kronoberg County
Swedish municipal seats
Finnveden